is a professional footballer who currently plays for Taiwanese team Taichung Futuro F.C. Born in Japan, he represents the Chinese Taipei national football team at international level.

Career statistics

Club

Notes

References

1987 births
Living people
Sportspeople from Yokohama
Association football people from Kanagawa Prefecture
Japanese footballers
Taiwanese footballers
Taiwanese people of Japanese descent
Chinese Taipei international footballers
Association football midfielders
Singapore Premier League players
Taiwan Football Premier League players
YSCC Yokohama players
Japan Soccer College players
Albirex Niigata Singapore FC players
Taichung Futuro F.C. players
Japanese expatriate footballers
Japanese expatriate sportspeople in Singapore
Expatriate footballers in Singapore
Japanese expatriate sportspeople in Thailand
Expatriate footballers in Thailand
Japanese emigrants
Immigrants to Taiwan
Naturalised citizens of Taiwan